The men's freestyle lightweight competition at the 1964 Summer Olympics in Tokyo took place from 11 to 14 October at the Komazawa Gymnasium. Nations were limited to one competitor.

Competition format

This freestyle wrestling competition continued to use the "bad points" elimination system introduced at the 1928 Summer Olympics for Greco-Roman and at the 1932 Summer Olympics for freestyle wrestling, as adjusted at the 1960 Summer Olympics. Each bout awarded 4 points. If the victory was by fall, the winner received 0 and the loser 4. If the victory was by decision, the winner received 1 and the loser 3. If the bout was tied, each wrestler received 2 points. A wrestler who accumulated 6 or more points was eliminated. Rounds continued until there were 3 or fewer uneliminated wrestlers. If only 1 wrestler remained, he received the gold medal. If 2 wrestlers remained, point totals were ignored and they faced each other for gold and silver (if they had already wrestled each other, that result was used). If 3 wrestlers remained, point totals were ignored and a round-robin was held among those 3 to determine medals (with previous head-to-head results, if any, counting for this round-robin).

Results

Round 1

 Bouts

 Points

Round 2

Valchev was the only wrestler to win both of his bouts by fall to stay at 0 points. Seven wrestlers were eliminated with losses in each of the first two rounds. Fifteen advanced to round 3.

 Bouts

 Points

Round 3

Five competitors were eliminated, leaving 10 to continue forward. Valchev, with his third win by fall, stayed at 0 points.

 Bouts

 Points

Round 4

This round was highly unusual in that 3 of the 4 winners were eliminated along with only 2 of the 4 losers. Beriashvili defeated Valchev to give the latter wrestler his first points, but the Soviet picked up his 6th point in doing so and was eliminated. The match between Ruth and Marsh resulted in both wrestlers receiving enough points for elimination. The bout between Horiuchi and Movahed, where a victory of any kind would eliminate the loser and allow the victor to continue, resulted in a draw—keeping both men in the competition.

 Bouts

 Points

Round 5

Rost had the great fortune to receive the bye in this round, guaranteeing he would continue while the field narrowed. Horiuchi's victory over Atalay in this round eliminated both men at 6 points; it also ultimately served as the tie-breaker between the two for the bronze medal. In the other match of the round, Movahed needed a win by fall to stay in competition, while Valchev would continue with any win or a tie. A Movahed victory by decision would eliminate both (and leave Rost alone uneliminated). Ultimately, the match ended in a tie; Valchev continued on to face Rost in the final while Movahed took 5th place.

 Bouts

 Points

Final round

With only two wrestlers left, they faced each other in a gold medal bout. Valchev defeated Rost by decision.

 Bouts

 Points

References

Wrestling at the 1964 Summer Olympics